Jüri Mihkel Soontak (30 July 1901 Koonga Parish, Pärnu County – 14 August 1941 Pärnu) was an Estonian politician. He was a member of V Riigikogu.

References

1901 births
1941 deaths
Members of the Riigikogu, 1932–1934